The Edward B. Newton School is a historic school building at 131 Pauline Street in Winthrop, Massachusetts.  It is a large H-shaped -story brick Tudor Revival building, set on the north side of Pauline Street in central Winthrop.   It was designed by William M. Bacon and built in 1908. It was named after Edward B. Newton, a longtime Winthrop resident who was a member of the school committee for 17 years, who donated funds for the clock.

The building was listed on the National Register of Historic Places in 1997. Today it is the Winthrop Public Schools Administration Center.

Gallery

See also
National Register of Historic Places listings in Suffolk County, Massachusetts

References

Winthrop, Massachusetts
School buildings on the National Register of Historic Places in Massachusetts
Buildings and structures in Suffolk County, Massachusetts
National Register of Historic Places in Suffolk County, Massachusetts